Jungle Fever is a Latin soul album by The Chakachas.

Track listing
Arranged by Willy Albimoor. Produced by Roland Kluger.

References

1970 albums
The Chakachas albums
Polydor Records albums